Peter Neil Muller AO (3 July 1927 – 17 February 2023) was an Australian architect with works in New South Wales, Victoria, Adelaide, Bali, and Lombok.

Early life and education
Muller was born in Adelaide on 3 July 1927. He was educated at St Peter's College from 1942 to 1944. He studied at the University of Adelaide graduating with Bachelor of Engineering degree together with the South Australian School of Mines and Industries graduating with a Fellowship in Architecture in 1948.

Muller won the Board of Architectural Education and Royal Australian Institute of Architects traveling scholarship in 1947. He won a Fulbright Traveling Scholarship and was awarded a Graduate Tuition Scholarship at the University of Pennsylvania, Philadelphia in 1950/1951, where he obtained a Master of Architecture degree. Muller became an Associate of the Royal British Institute of Architects. He began private practice in Sydney in 1952.

In 1953, Muller married Rosemary Winn Patrick. They had three children named Peter, Suzy, and James. In 1964, they divorced and he married Carole Margaret Mason, whom he also divorced in 1991. He remarried, but three years after the death of his third wife, Helen Hayes, in 2001, he returned to Sydney and reunited with Carole.

Career
Muller took an alternative design approach to the then-contemporary modern movement. He travelled and lived in many places around the world which included France, London, Bali, South Australia and Sydney. He had several influences including Adrian Snodgrass (1952), Albert Read (1954) and lastly, Frank Lloyd Wright (1952) whom only "influenced him on the Audette house at the beginning of his practice". In Sydney 1953, Muller worked in his own architectural practice called 'The Office of Peter Muller'. He avoided synthetic finishes and instead used natural materials, as he felt strongly about the Australian landscape. This is reflected in many of his Sydney contemporaries.

Muller later moved to Marulan, New South Wales where he practiced at home in his grazing property "Glenrock". In 1962 Muller tutored at the University of New South Wales and worked as a director of the National Capital Branch of the National Capital Development Commission in Canberra from 1975 to 1977. This helped and allowed him to author 'The Esoteric Nature of Griffin’s Design for Canberra’ in 1976. Later, in 1978, he was the founding Principal of Regional Design and Research and he has acted independently from locations all around the world as a consultant for 'Peter Muller International'.

In the 2014 Australia Day Honours, Muller was appointed Officer of the Order of Australia (AO) "for distinguished service to architecture, to the adaptation and preservation of Indigenous design and construction, and to the integration of the built and environmental landscape."

Personal life and death
Muller died on 17 February 2023, at the age of 95.

Notable projects

Richardson House
949 Barrenjoey Road, Palm Beach, Sydney, Australia, 1956

Like many of Peter Muller’s designs, the Richardson House began with extensive research of the site. Muller designed this house to sit on the edge of a cliff face, seven metres below the adjoining road and fifteen metres above the water. One design key was the use of circles as the primary motif. This motif came from the form of a large rock already on the site. Twenty-nine hollow cylinders, made of curved concrete blocks and of a natural grey and green appearance, made up the main support system. Muller was a designer of organic architecture and all of the interior spaces of this design are connected and freely flowing.

Hoyts Cinema Centre
134-144 Bourke Street, Melbourne, Australia

The Hoyts cinema Centre, designed in 1966 and completed in 1969, is considered unique due to the shape of the building, taking similar traits to an upside down oriental pagoda was seen to be of considerable interest in the local area. In fact the design was based on a structural idea of bracketing each floor out similar to the way in which very wide eave overhangs were created in Chinese and Japanese roofs. This particular building is the largest built project by Peter Muller and was the first 'cinema centre' of its kind in Australia; housing three screens in the complex.

Publications

Publications by Peter Muller
Monograph
 The Esoteric Nature of Griffin's Design for Canberra, Canberra 1976
Books
 The New and Permanent Parliament House, with others, Canberra 1977
 Canberra and the New Parliament House, with others, Dee Why West, New South Wales 1983

Publications on Peter Muller

Books
 An Australian Identity by Jennifer Taylor, Sydney 1972
 Fine Houses of Sydney by Robert Irving, John Kinstler and Max Dupain, Sydney 1982
 Architecture Bali by Bingham-Hall, Pesaro Publications 2000
 Peter Muller by Jacqueline C. Urford (398 page editions) 2013 
 Eight books on or by Peter Muller
Articles
 "Molinari House" in Architecture and Arts (Melbourne), July 1954
 "Audette House" in Architecture in Australia (Sydney), July/September 1955
 Special issue on Peter Muller in Architecture and Arts (Melbourne), December 1955
 "Peter Muller House" in Architecture in Australia (Sydney), January/March 1956
 "Richardon House" in Architecture and Arts (Melboume), August 1956
 "House by Peter Muller" in La Architettura (Rome), August 1958
 "Craftbuilt Houses" in Architecture in Australia (Sydney), September 1961
 Article by David Saunders in Art and Architecture (Sydney), June 1971
 Numerous illustrated articles in The Australian Home Beautiful, Voque Australia/ France, Belle, 1955–1999

Theses 
 "Peter Muller Domestic Architecture-The First Ten Years" by J.C.Urford 1984, in 6 Volumes, University of Sydney
 "The Architecture of Peter Muller " by J.C. Urford 1993 in 9 Volumes, University of Sydney
 "Discriminating Eyes in Bali, Indonesia" by Vanessa R. Preisler, University of Oregon, U.S.A.

Complete list of works 
 1952
Audette House, Edinburgh Road, Castlecrag, Sydney
Olympic Stadium Competition, Melbourne, Vic.
 1953
Molinari House, Forestville, Sydney.
 1954
Winns Department Store, Ware St, Fairfield, Sydney
Muller House, 42 Bynya Road, Whale Beach, Sydney
 1955
Walcott House. 40 Bynya Road. Whale Beach, Sydney
Palm Beach Real Estate offices, Palm Beach
Sydney Opera House Competition
Barnaby House, Beaumont, Texas, U.S.A.
Slyper House, Holland.
 1956
Richardson House, 949 Barrenjoey Road, Palm Beach,
 1957
McGrath House, 4 Dunara Gardens. Pt Piper,Sydney
Nicholson House, Angophora Cres, Forestville, Sydney
Commonwealth Bank, Taree
Commonwealth Bank Eastwood.
Coogee Apartment Block for Dr. R. Stewart-Jones
 1958
Walker House, 21 Arterial Road, St. Ives, Sydney
Palm Beach Kindergarten, Palm Beach, NSW
Victa H.O., 318 Horsley Road, Milperra, Sydney •
Ward House, Foote St. Templestowe. Melboume, Vic.
 1959
Sculfer House, Livistonia Lane, Palm Beach.Sydney
Richardson Ski Lodge, Thredbo Village. N.S.W.
Fogarty House, Dunalister Stud, Elmore, Victoria
 1960
Southside Plaza Shopping Centre, Rockdale, Sydney
Rockdale Plaza Ten Pin Bowling Centre
McGrath/O'Neill Ski Lodge, Thredbo Village, NSW
Gunning House, 369 Edinburgh Rd, Castlecrag, NSW
Hoyts Cinema Centre, Newcastle, N.S.W.
 1960/78
Eight Craftbuilt Prototype Houses, various locations.
 1961
Patrick House, The Scarp, Castlecrag, Sydney
Park House, Prince Alfred Parade, Newport, Sydney
 1962
Creaser House, I Womerah Street, Turramurra, Sydney
Hamilton House, I Pindari Place, Bayview, Sydney
Purcell House, 14 Fisher Street, Balgowlah, Sydney
Lance House, I Lindsay Avenue, Darling Point, Sydney
Barling House, 4 Paradise Ave., Clareville, Sydney.
 1963
Barton House. Morella Place, Castlecove, Sydney
Green House, 7 Wolseley Road, Point Piper, Sydney
Walder House, Cabarita Road, Stokes Point, Sydney
 1964
Lance House, Coolong Road, Vaucluse, Sydney
Mitchell House, 20 Robe Terrace, Medindie, S.A.
I.P.E.C. H.O. 259 Glen Osmond Rd. Frewville, S.A.
Greenwood House, Mulgowrie Ave, Balgowlah, Sydney.
 1965
Walder House, 61a Kambala Road, Bellevue Hill.
I.P.E.C. Airfreight Terminal, Launceston, Tasmania
Carroll House, Rockbath Road, Palm Beach, Sydney
McArthur House, Tor Walk, Castlecrag, Sydney.
 1966
Dickson Hotel, Dickson, Canberra, A.C.T.
Hoyts Drive-in theatre, Tamworth, N.S.W.
 1967
Hoyts Drive-in theatre, Casula, Sydney
Hoyts Cinema Centre, Bourke St. Melbourne
 1968
McGrath House, 8 Castra Pl, Double Bay, Sydney
Hoyts Drive-in theatre, Bulleen Rd., Melbourne.
Hoyts Drive-in theatre, Wantirna, Vic.
Regent/Paris theatres & arcade, Rundle St. Adelaide (Redesigned and rebuilt by a local firm of architects)
Walsh house, 7 St. Andrews Drive, Glen Osmond.
Schwartz house, Palmerston St. Watson's Bay, Sydney
 1969
Townhouses, Trelawney St., Woollahra, Sydney
Turner House, 8 Sylvan Ave. East Lindfield, Sydney
1969–1971
Five projects for Tony Bambridge, Tahiti
 1970
Matahari Hotel, Sanur Beach Bali
Dulhunty homestead, Nant Lodge, Glen Innes, N.S.W.
Steidler house, 7a Wentworth St. Pt. Piper, Sydney
"Winderadeen" homestead restoration + manager's house (Lake George, for Mr. & Mrs. Garner Anthony, Honolulu).
Coolangata Apartment Tower, Queensland.
 1971
Snider house, 12 Wolseley Rd. Pt. Piper, Sydney
Woolf house, 7 Gulliver Ave. Vaucluse, Sydney
Burrell Homestead, Rockdale, Armidale, N.S.W.
 1972
Peter Muller house, Campuan, Bali, Indonesia
 1973
Kayu Aya Hotel, Seminyak, Bali, Indonesia.
 1975–77
Director, National Capital Development Commission to set up criteria for Parliament House competition
 1977–2001
The Bali Oberoi, (continuous upgrading of Kayu Aya)
 1978
Establishment of Regional Design and Research RDR
Lian Cove Beach hotel, Batangas, Luzon, Philippines
1,200 luxury housing settlement, Jubail, Saudi Arabia
 1979
Peter Muller house, Unawatuna Beach via Galle, Sri Lanka, begun 1977.
Travelodge Condominium Apartments, Papette, Tahiti
 1980
The Oberoi Kolva Beach resort hotel, Goa, India
 1982
The Karnak Oberoi hotel, Luxor, Egypt
Si-Rusa resort hotel development, Pt. Dickson, Malaysia
 1983
67 Townhouses, Sailfish Pt. Gold Coast, Queensland
 1985
Williams House, 64 Minkara Rd. Bayview Heights, Sydney
 1988–89
Amandari Hotel, Kedewatan, Bali, Indonesia.
 1994
Amandari Village (13 luxury estates), Kedewatan, Bali
 1995–1998
Antap West Bali Luxury housing estate.
The Oberoi Ubud, Bali, Indonesia.
The Oberoi Bedugal, Bali, Indonesia.
Canyon Ranch Health Complex, West Bali, Indonesia.
 1997
The Oberoi Lombok, Indonesia
 1998
Canyon Ranch health complex, Masala Alam, Red Sea
Amandari Village Show Villa built.
 2007
Prickle Farm, Ilford, NSW for daughter Suzy Flowers
Restorations
 1964–85
"Glenrock" homestead, Marulan for Peter Muller
 1970
"Winderadeen" homestead, Lake George, N.S.W. for Mr. & Mrs. Garner Anthony, Honolulu.
 1972–87
Peter Muller house, Campuan, Bali
 1977
Peter Muller house, Unawatuna Beach (Galle) Sri Lanka
 1997–2003
Hayes Lodge, Loches, France (1679). for Helen Hayes
"Kookynie" homestead, Clare, S.A. for Peter Muller

References

External links 
 Peter Muller Official website
 Peter Muller on Architects Database

1927 births
2023 deaths
People educated at St Peter's College, Adelaide
New South Wales architects
University of Pennsylvania School of Design alumni
Officers of the Order of Australia